The R.T.V. International Trophy was a professional golf tournament. In its first year, 1967, there was a professional team tournament between the four home nations at Edmondstown Golf Course, County Dublin. The next year the event became an individual tournament played at Cork Golf Club, Little Island, Cork, Ireland. The individual event was held twice, in 1968 and 1969. The tournaments were sponsored by R.T.V. Rentals.

Team event (1967)
The tournament was played on 25, 26 and 27 August with each team playing the other three. There were teams of 6 with 3 foursomes matches in the morning and 6 singles in the afternoon. All matches were over 18 holes. The total prize money was £3,480.

The teams were:
England: Peter Alliss (Captain), Brian Barnes, Fred Boobyer, Neil Coles, Malcolm Gregson, Tony Grubb
Scotland: John Panton (Captain), Harry Bannerman, Eric Brown, John Burns, Iain Clark, George Will
Wales: Dai Rees (Captain), Richard Davies, Brian Huggett, Peter Jones, Hugh Lewis, Dave Thomas
Ireland: Christy O'Connor Snr (Captain), Hugh Boyle, Christy Greene, Ernie Jones, Nicky Lynch,  Paddy Skerritt

Brian Barnes played for England, although he later represented Scotland in team events.

The event was the second attempt to run a regular professional home nations tournament, but like the first attempt, the Llandudno International Golf Trophy in 1938, it was only run once. The winning captain in 1938, Percy Alliss, was the father of the winning captain in 1967, Peter Alliss. A similar format was used for the 1971 Double Diamond International.

Matches
Friday 25 August

Saturday 26 August

Sunday 27 August

Final table

Winners (1968 and 1969)

References

Team golf tournaments
Golf tournaments in the Republic of Ireland
Golf in County Dublin
Golf in Munster
Sport in County Cork
1960s in Irish sport